FK Pljevlja is a Montenegrin football club based in the town of Pljevlja. They currently compete in Montenegrin Third League - North Region.

Notable players
  Milan Mijatović
  Žarko Tomašević
  Lazar Jeremić
  Milivoje Mrdak
  Strahinja Bujišić

References 

Football clubs in Montenegro
1997 establishments in Montenegro